Maa Pelliki Randi is a 2000 Indian Telugu-language drama film, starring J. D. Chakravarthy and Sakshi Sivanand, the film had a good run upon release. It's a Telugu remake of the 1999 Tamil hit film Unakkaga Ellam Unakkaga directed by Sundar C starring Karthik and Rambha.

Cast 
J. D. Chakravarthy as Kumar
Sakshi Sivanand as Anjali
Nagesh
AVS 
Brahmanandam
Gautam Raju 
Sudhakar as Rambabu

Soundtrack 

Music by S. A. Rajkumar, who preiovusly worked with the director for Raja (1999).

Production
The film marks the second collaboration between the director and producer after Priya O Priya. The film's title was changed from 'Maa Pelli Sandadi' to 'Maa Pelliki Randi' . The film was supposed to release in April 2000, but was delayed to 14 July 2000.

Release
The Full Hyderabad wrote that "Even with all these drawbacks the movie is worth a watch for the laughs, if not for anything else".

References

External links
 

2000 films
2000s Telugu-language films
2000 drama films
Telugu remakes of Tamil films
Indian romantic comedy-drama films
2000 romantic comedy-drama films
Films scored by S. A. Rajkumar
Films directed by Muppalaneni Shiva
2000 comedy films